Kharif District  is a district of the 'Amran Governorate, Yemen. As of 2003, the district had a population of 45,977 inhabitants. On July 13, 2020, it is reported that the Houthi militia captured the last Jews of Yemen in the Kharif District.

References

Districts of 'Amran Governorate
Kharif District